The men's javelin F53/54 event at the 2008 Summer Paralympics took place at the Beijing National Stadium at 09:10 on 12 September. There was a single round of competition; after the first three throws, only the top seven had 3 further throws (there is no indication on the official result as to why this was not the normal eight).
The competition was won by Markku Niinimaki, representing .

Results

 
WR = World Record. SB = Seasonal Best.

References

Athletics at the 2008 Summer Paralympics